More Radio Worthing (known as Splash FM from 2003 to 2016), is an Independent Local Radio station serving Worthing, Shoreham, Littlehampton and surrounding areas. It is owned and operated by Total Sense Media and broadcasts from studios at The Guildbourne Centre in Worthing, as part of a network of stations across Sussex.

History

In April 2008, the station became part of Media Sound Holdings, after merging with neighbouring radio station Mid Sussex-based Bright FM. In June 2009, the group added Arrow FM in Hastings and Sovereign FM in Eastbourne to their portfolio from TLRC.

In November 2010, Ofcom approved a request to share programming across all four stations, stating the changes would not substantially alter the character of the service.

Programming
All programming on the station is produced locally from More Radio's Worthing studios and shared with More Radio Hastings (formerly Arrow FM), More Radio Mid-Sussex (Bright FM) and More Radio Eastbourne (Sovereign FM).

Local news airs every hour from 6am to 6pm on weekdays and from 8am to 12pm on Saturdays with headlines on the half-hour during weekday breakfast and drivetime shows. National news bulletins from Sky News Radio are carried hourly at all other times.

References

External links
Official Website

Worthing
Companies based in West Sussex
Radio stations in Sussex
Radio stations established in 2003